John Russell CBE (22 January 1919 – 23 August 2008) was an English art critic.

Life and career
John Russell was born in Fleet, Hampshire, England, in 1919. He attended St Paul's School and then Magdalen College, Oxford.

He was an unpaid intern at the Tate Gallery in 1940, but moved to the country after the gallery was bombed. During World War II he worked in Naval Intelligence for the Admiralty. There he met Ian Fleming, who helped to secure Russell a reviewing position at The Sunday Times. Russell succeeded a fired critic at The Sunday Times in 1950.

Art critic Hilton Kramer of The New York Times hired Russell in 1974. Russell was chief art critic there from 1982 to 1990.

Marriages
Russell was married to:
 Alexandrina, Countess Apponyi de Nagy-Appony, the former wife of Julius Lanczy. They married in 1945, divorced in 1951, and had one child, Lavinia (married Sir Nicholas Grimshaw).
Vera Poliakoff (died 1992), married 1956, divorced 1971. Also known professionally as Vera Lindsay, she was an artist and actress, daughter of Vladimir Poliakoff and former wife of British journalist Sir Gerald Reid Barry, with whom she had two sons.
Rosamond Bernier (née Rosamond Margaret Rosenbaum, formerly Mrs Georges Bernier, formerly Mrs Lewis Riley), a lecturer and founder of the art magazine L'ŒIL. They married in 1975.

Death
Russell died on 23 August 2008 at a hospice in the Bronx.

Books
His books include:
 John Russell, 1971, Francis Bacon, London: Thames & Hudson.
 John Russell: Marc Klionsky
 John Russell: Matisse, Father & Son, Harry N. Abrams, Inc., 1999, 
 John Russell: The Meanings of Modern Art (1981, 2nd revised edition 1992)
 John Russell, Erich Kleiber: "A memoir" (London 1957)
 John Russell: Paris (London, 1960)
 John Russell: Shakespeare's Country
 John Russell: Switzerland 
 John Russell: Reading Russell'' (New York and London, 1989), collected journalism 
and books on Seurat (1965), Vuillard (1971) and Henry Moore

Notes and references

1919 births
2008 deaths
People educated at St Paul's School, London
Alumni of Magdalen College, Oxford
Royal Navy personnel of World War II
English art critics
The Sunday Times people
Critics employed by The New York Times
Commanders of the Order of the British Empire
People from Fleet, Hampshire
English male non-fiction writers
20th-century English male writers
British expatriates in the United States